Sobia Anwar Satti is a Pakistani politician who was a Member of the Provincial Assembly of the Punjab, from May 2013 to May 2018.

Early life and education
She was born on 2 October 1982 in Rawalpindi.

She earned the degree of Master of Business Administration from Army Public College of Management Science, Rawalpindi in 2004.

Political career

She was elected to the Provincial Assembly of the Punjab as a candidate of Pakistan Muslim League (N) on a reserved seat for women in 2013 Pakistani general election.

References

Living people
Women members of the Provincial Assembly of the Punjab
Punjab MPAs 2013–2018
1982 births
Pakistan Muslim League (N) politicians
21st-century Pakistani women politicians